Jason Bergmann (born March 13, 1978) is an American strongman competitor and entrant to the World's Strongest Man competition on multiple occasions.

Career
Jason Bergmann came to international attention with a third-place finish in the All-American Strongman Challenge 2007. He then became a leading competitor on the Strongman Super Series circuit and in 2008 came second in the America's Strongest Man competition. Having then been invited to the 2008 World's Strongest Man he made the final ten (coming ninth overall). Strong finishes in the Strongman Super Series grands prix in Venice Beach and Gothenburg were followed by a period of injury. In 2010 he began competing again and once again made the final ten of the prestigious 2010 World's Strongest Man, having made the final on both occasions he had competed at the premier strongman competition.

Competition record
 2006
 9. - All-American Strongman Challenge 2006
 2007
 3. - All-American Strongman Challenge 2007
 4. - Super Series 2007: Mohegan Sun
 2008
 5. - Super Series 2008: Mohegan Sun
 4. - All-American Strongman Challenge 2008
 2. - America's Strongest Man 2008
 9. - World's Strongest Man 2008
 2. - Poland vs USA team event
 2009
 3. - Super Series 2009: Venice Beach
 3. - Super Series 2009: Göteborg
 2010
 10. - World's Strongest Man 2010

References

American strength athletes
1978 births
Living people